Léon Lampo (28 January 1923 – 16 November 1985) was a Belgian basketball player. He competed in the men's tournament at the 1948 Summer Olympics.

References

1923 births
1985 deaths
Belgian men's basketball players
Olympic basketball players of Belgium
Basketball players at the 1948 Summer Olympics
Place of birth missing